Diamondville may refer to:
 Diamondville microprocessor, an Intel Atom microprocessor
 Diamondville, California
 Diamondville, Wyoming